John H. Dallum is a former politician in the U.S. state of Oregon. He served in the Oregon House of Representatives for District 59, which covers The Dalles, Madras and John Day. Dallum, a Republican, was appointed to the legislature in June 2004 to the seat vacated by fellow Republican John Mabrey, who had resigned after being indicted for theft.

He was subsequently elected twice to the House, defeating Democrats Jack Lorts in 2004 and Jim Gilbertson in 2006. Dallum announced July 16, 2007, that he would resign his seat effective the end of that month.  His stated reason was to take a job as a school superintendent in Valier, Montana, a location nearer his grown children. Prior to his career as a politician, Dallum was an educator for 35 years in Oregon and Montana.

References

 

Living people
Republican Party members of the Oregon House of Representatives
Year of birth missing (living people)
People from Pondera County, Montana
21st-century American politicians
People from The Dalles, Oregon